Eller is a 1979 sculpture by Metin Yurdanur located in the Abdi İpekçi Park in Ankara.

The sculpture was made by Metin Yurdanur in 1979 for the Abdi İpekçi Park. About the sculpture, Yurdanur stated "i see the hands as part of the brain and the eyes." The sculpture is made from poured concrete over a metal construction.

It was initiated as part of an initiative towards the end of the 70's by the Mayor of the Ankara Municipality, Ali Dinçer. The initiative aimed to put sculptures free in topic around the public spaces of the city.

The last pouring of the concrete for the sculpture was done before the 12 September coup. Yurdanur was worried, particularly due to the warm temperature at the time, that he would not be able to water the concrete due to the ban on going outside during the coup. As soon as the ban was lifted he went to water the concrete.

The sculpture was renovated/refreshed by Yurdanur himself, 43 years after its initial opening. Yurdanur stated that "It is important for living artists to overhaul their own works years later."

External links 
Archived photos of when a performance artist wrapped the sculpture via Salt Research
Panoramic View via Google Maps

References

Sources

Citations 

Concrete sculptures
Monuments and memorials in Ankara
Outdoor sculptures in Turkey
1979 sculptures